Zaynab bint ʿĀmir ibn ʿUwaymir ibn ʿAbd Shams ibn ʿAttāb al-Farāsīyya al-Kinānīyya, known by her kunya "Umm Rūmān" was a female companion of Muhammad. She was a wife of Abu Bakr and the mother of Aisha.

Biography
Zaynab was the daughter of Amir ibn Uwaymir, a member of the Al-Harith ibn Ghanam clan of the Kinana tribe. She married al-Ḥārith ibn Sakhbarah, who was from the Azd tribe, and they had one son, Ṭufayl. The family moved to Mecca, where al-Harith formed an alliance with Abu Bakr. He was already married to Qutaylah bint ʿAbd al-ʿUzzā.

Shortly afterwards, Umm Ruman was widowed and left with no support. Abu Bakr then married her. They had two children: ʿAbd al-Raḥmān and Aisha.

Umm Ruman emigrated to Medina in 622, accompanied by Aisha and by her stepchildren Asma and Abd Allah.

Ibn Sa'd states that Umm Ruman died in Medina in April/May 628. However, Ibn Hajar al-Asqalani places her death in 630. As she was being lowered into her grave, Muhammad said, "Anyone who wants to know what a houri looks like should look at Umm Ruman."

References

Bibliography
 Great Women of Islam (Dar-us-Salam Publications)

Women companions of the Prophet
Abu Bakr family
628 deaths
Year of birth unknown